This article features the 1998 CONCACAF U-20 Tournament qualifying stage. Caribbean and Central American teams entered in separate tournaments. The North American teams Canada, Mexico and the United States automatically qualified, as well as main tournament hosts Guatemala (Central America) and Trinidad and Tobago (Caribbean). Twelve Caribbean teams entered, of which one qualified and four Central American teams entered, of which two qualified.

Caribbean

First round
The scores between the Netherlands Antilles and Dominica are unknown, but the Netherlands Antilles won.

|}

Second round
Guyana, Jamaica and Puerto Rico entered the tournament in this round. Aruba, Haiti and Suriname were supposed to as well, but they did not.

|}

Final Round
Antigua and Barbuda entered the tournament this round. Group winners Jamaica qualified for the main tournament.

Central America

First round
Honduras received a bye because Nicaragua withdrew.

|}

Second round
Costa Rica qualified directly for the main tournament because Belize withdrew. Honduras also qualified by beating Panama.

|}

Qualified for Main Tournament
  (Central American winner, but without playing)
  (Central American winner)
  (Caribbean winner)

See also
 1998 CONCACAF U-20 Tournament

External links
Results by RSSSF

CONCACAF U-20 Championship qualification
CONCACAF U-20 Tournament qualifying